On Golden Pond may refer to:

 On Golden Pond (play), a 1979 play by Ernest Thompson
 On Golden Pond (1981 film), a film adaptation of the play, starring Katharine Hepburn and Henry Fonda
 On Golden Pond (2001 film), a television adaptation of the play, starring Julie Andrews and Christopher Plummer